The Tiasquam River is a  stream on the southwest of Martha's Vineyard, Massachusetts.

The creek arises in the eastern section of Chilmark, and flows generally east, then south, into West Tisbury, Massachusetts to feed the Tisbury Great Pond, which in turn empties into the Atlantic Ocean from the island's southern shore.

References 

 Martha's Vineyard Watersheds
 Vineyard Gazette: Tiasquam River Reservation

Martha's Vineyard
Rivers of Dukes County, Massachusetts
Rivers of Massachusetts